The 1959 Giro d'Italia was the 42nd running of the Giro d'Italia, one of cycling's Grand Tour races. The Giro started in Milan, on 16 May, with a  stage and concluded back in Milan, on 7 June, with a  leg. A total of 120 riders from 15 teams entered the 20-stage race, which was won by Luxembourgian Charly Gaul of the  team. The second and third places were taken by Frenchman Jacques Anquetil and Italian Diego Ronchini, respectively.

Teams

In the weeks preceding the Giro's start, Jacques Anquetil and the  team were interested in participating in the race; however, they desired an appearance fee. After calls were made, the team eventually settled on coming to the race. Ultimately, thirteen teams were invited by the race organizers to participate in the 1959 edition of the Giro d'Italia. Each team sent a squad of ten riders, which meant that the race started with a peloton of 130 cyclists. From the riders that began the race, 86 made it to the finish in Milan.

The teams entering the race were:

Pre-race favorites

Jacques Anquetil and Charly Gaul were seen as favorites to win the race. Anquetil entered the Giro with a formidable Helyett–Leroux–Fynsec–Hutchinson team that included the likes of 1958 Vuelta a España winner Jean Stablinski, the 1958 Tour de France's most "elegant" rider Edouard Delberghe, Irishman Seamus Elliot, and Jean Graczyk. When asked about his chances to win the race Anquetil stated: "I know that I am in good shape. If I am beaten, it will mean there are better riders than myself in the race." Reigning world champion Ercole Baldini was seen as a contender to win the race, but due to an operation at the beginning of the cycling season he entered the race weighing more than normal. Charly Gaul entered as a previous winner of the Giro d'Italia in 1956 Giro d'Italia, as well as the reigning champion of the Tour de France.

Faema–Guerra's Rik Van Looy had desires to win a Grand Tour during his career and had previously raced the Giro in 1955 and Vuelta a España in 1958, not finishing either race. However, during the 1959 campaign, Looy won the Giro di Sardegna and Vuelta a Levante, as well as finishing third in the Vuelta a España. Faema–Guerra entered with a completely Belgian team except for German Hans Junkerman and had gotten the nickname "Red Guard" because of their red jerseys, the team was well known for setting up Looy for stage victories. Miguel Poblet stated he was not there just to win stages.

Route and stages

The route for the race was released on 2 April 1959 at the Casino della Valle in Saint Vincent in front of journalists, local dignitaries, and various industrialists. There were four individual time trials within the race of which one, stage 7, was a climbing time trial up to Mount Vesuvius. Ten stages contained a total 15 categorized climbs. The only rest day was scheduled on 27 May in Rimini. The race consisted of 22 days of racing and was covered .

Regarding the route for the Giro d'Italia, Corriere dello Sport writer Cesare Facetti felt that the route was very difficult and would make it very difficult for a rider to complete the Giro d'Italia and be successful in the Tour de France in late June.

Race overview

The race began with the introductions in the Duomo square in front of the Milan cathedral, with Baldini received the loudest ovation upon his introduction. The opening leg finished at the famed Spa town Salsomaggiore. During the stage, only one breakaway was able to sustain a lengthy advantage over the peloton and that came  into the race with a solo attack by Darrigade (Helyett). The day ended with a bunch sprint won by Belgian Rik Van Looy. 

The following stage was the first individual time trial of the race, which Anquetil was favored to win. Anquetil won the day by twenty-five seconds ahead of Rolf Graf and assumed the race lead. He rode the stage on a 52 x 13 gear, which when Gaul found out following the stage said "Nobody, not even Anquetil, can push that gear." The first summit finish came with the third leg that ended on the Abetone. A twelve-man group containing Looy and Jos Hoevenaers reached the climb first, while a second major group containing the favorites likes Anquetil and Gaul reached the climb after. Gaul attacked at the beginning of the climb and reached the first group alone. He rode with them for a short time before attacking and going on solo to win the stage and take the race lead.

Around  into the fourth stage, near Pistoie, a group of nine broke away from the peloton and established a lead of five minutes that soon grew to eleven as the stage progressed. The peloton reacted and began to increase their tempo, but they did not catch the breakaway. In the breakaway, some riders cracked leaving Arturo Neri, Armando Pellegrini, Aurelio Cestari, and Gastone Nencini at the front. Pellegrini edged out Cestari and Nencini to take the stage, while Neri dropped before the finish line and finished four seconds behind.

During the sixth leg into Naples, Seamus Elliot (Helyett–Pontin) attacked from the leading breakaway as the stage came to a close, primarily because of sprinter Miguel Poblet's (Ignis) presence in the breakaway. He went under one kilometer left before he cramped with  remaining and was overtaken. Poblet won the stage, while Elliot held on to get 10th place. The next day's stage was a  climbing individual time trial along a road on Mount Vesuvius, which ended at the observatory on the volcano. As the riders began the time trial in reverse of the standings for the general classification, contenders Anquetil and Gaul were the final two to get on the course. Anquetil again chose a larger gear (45 x 20), while Gaul chose a smaller gear (45 x 23). Anquetil was faster over the initial stretch of the race which covered the cobblestones, but after that stretch, Gaul closed the gap. Gaul finished eight seconds after Anquetil did, winning the stage by 37 seconds over Guido Boni (Tricofilina). A  time trial followed the next day, but this time it was around the island of Ischia. The course was rather hilly and was won by Antonino Catalano (Bianchi), while with respect to the general classification, Anquetil managed to gain 22 seconds on Gaul.

San Marino was the destination of the twelfth leg and it could be reached by one road when entering from Romini, a steep and rough road. The course featured two and a half circuits before its conclusion uphill. Anquetil attacked on the flat roads before the final climb and Nino Defilippis won the stage. Anquetil, who placed third, gained time he gained on the general classification contenders, put him 34 seconds behind the leader Gaul.

After the leading riders had crossed the Costalunga during the fifteenth day, Gaul descended with an advantage on a group containing Poblet, Anquetil, and Van Looy. The riders caught and passed Gaul when he suffered a puncture on the descent. The trio opened a large gap and Poblet won the stage, while Gaul crossed 2 minutes and 33 seconds behind. This loss gave Anquetil the race lead.

In the  time trial to Susa, Anquetil caught Gaul  into the stage. Gaul proceeded to ride in Anquetil's slipstream for the remainder of the stage before Anquetil dropped him in the final kilometer.

Classification leadership

One jersey was worn during the 1959 Giro d'Italia. The leader of the general classification – calculated by adding the stage finish times of each rider – wore a pink jersey. This classification is the most important of the race, and its winner is considered as the winner of the Giro.

The mountains classification leader. The climbs were ranked in first and second categories. In this ranking, points were won by reaching the summit of a climb ahead of other cyclists. There were two categories of mountains. The first category awarded 80, 60, 40, 30, and 20 points, while the second distributed 60, 40, and 20 points. Although no jersey was awarded, there was also one classification for the teams, in which the teams were awarded points for their rider's performance during the stages.

Final standings

General classification

Mountains classification

Team classification

Aftermath

This was the first edition of the Giro d'Italia where an Italian did not lead the general classification after any stage. La Gazzetta wrote that the collective performance of the Italians in the Giro did not live up to expectations.

References

Citations

Bibliography

 

1959
Giro d'Italia
Giro d'Italia
Giro d'Italia
Giro d'Italia